Albert Laisant (1 June 1873 – 23 November 1928) was a French writer. His work was part of the literature event in the art competition at the 1924 Summer Olympics.

References

1873 births
1928 deaths
19th-century French male writers
20th-century French male writers
Olympic competitors in art competitions
Writers from Tours, France